The Supreme Court of Canada is the highest court of Canada. It was established by the Parliament of Canada through the Supreme and Exchequer Court Act of 1875. Since 1949, the Court has been the final court of appeal in the Canadian justice system. Originally composed of six justices (the Chief Justice of Canada and five puisne justices), the Court was expanded to seven justices by the creation of an additional puisne justice position in 1927, and then to nine justices by the creation of two more puisne justice positions in 1949.

The justices are appointed by the governor general on the advice of the prime minister. When a chief justice leaves office, the vacancy is traditionally filled by elevating an incumbent puisne justice to the position, which requires a separate appointment process. The first six justices of the Court were all appointed in 1875 by Governor General the Earl of Dufferin, on the advice of Prime Minister Alexander Mackenzie.

Of the nine justices, three positions are required by law to be held by judges who are either judges of the superior courts of Quebec, or members of the Bar of Quebec, at the time of their appointment. Traditionally, three of the remaining judges are appointed from Ontario, two from the four western provinces, and one from the Atlantic provinces. The judges from these provinces, other than Quebec, must have been a judge of a superior court, or a member of the bar of one of those provinces for ten or more years prior to the appointment.

Justices hold office until age 75, during good behaviour. They are removable by the Governor General on address of the Canadian Senate and House of Commons. When the Court was created in 1875, the justices had life tenure, but in 1927 this was converted to mandatory retirement at age 75. Because the legislation did not contain a grandfather clause it immediately applied to any judge who was already over age 75 at the time it came into force. As a result, Justice John Idington, aged 86, was forced to retire from the Court.

Since the Supreme Court was created in 1875, 90 persons have served on the Court. The length of overall service on the Court for the 81 non-incumbent justices ranges from Sir Lyman Duff's , to the 232-day tenure of John Douglas Armour. The length of service for the nine incumbent justices ranges from that of Michael Moldaver and Andromache Karakatsanis (who both started the same day),  to Mahmud Jamal's .

Justices 

In the table below, the index numbers in the far left column denote the order in which the justices were appointed as a Supreme Court puisne justice (or, as chief justice where the individual was appointed directly as chief justice). Also, a shaded row——denotes a current justice. Additionally, while many of the justices' positions prior to appointment are simply listed as "lawyer", many had part-time positions, such as teaching, or acted as counsel to various levels of government. The justices of the Supreme Court are:

Notes

Timeline of justices
This graphical timeline depicts the progression of the justices on the Supreme Court. Information regarding each justice's predecessors, successors and fellow justices, as well as their tenure on the court can be gleaned (and comparisons between justices drawn) from it. There are no formal names or numbers for the individual seats of the puisne justices.

Justices' birthplaces

Notes

Justices' legal backgrounds 

Of the 91 justices who have served on the court, just over half, 49, had previously served on provincial appellate courts, although not all of these were serving in that capacity immediately prior to their appointment (e.g. Beverley McLachlin had served on the British Columbia Court of Appeal before being named Chief Justice of the Supreme Court of British Columbia; Louise Arbour had served on the Court of Appeal for Ontario before being named Chief Prosecutor of the International Criminal Tribunals for Rwanda and the former Yugoslavia). Three served on the appellate division of the Federal Court of Canada: Frank Iacobucci as Chief Justice of the Court, and Gerald Le Dain and Marshall Rothstein as appellate justices. 

Twenty-eight justices were named to the Supreme Court directly from the bar without having previously served as judges, including one Chief Justice (Charles Fitzpatrick). Of those, eleven had served or were serving in various federal government capacities, including member of Parliament, cabinet minister, or deputy minister, prior to their appointment. A further 12 served on provincial superior trial courts.

Of the 31 justices appointed since 1980, only three had no prior judicial experience:  John Sopinka, Ian Binnie and Suzanne Côté.

References

Bibliography

External links
Supreme Court of Canada homepage

Supreme Court
Canada